There were 14 female and 50 male athletes representing the country at the 2000 Summer Paralympics and finished 13th on the medal table.

Medal table

See also
South Africa at the 2000 Summer Olympics
South Africa at the Paralympics

References

Bibliography

External links
International Paralympic Committee

Nations at the 2000 Summer Paralympics
Paralympics
2000